Grand Alatau  is a residential building complex in Astana, Kazakhstan. The complex has four towers of 20, 28, 38 and 43 floors and reaches a structural height of 150 m. It is located in the historical centre of the city, on the right bank of Ishim River opposite to the Central Park.

External links
Reference

Buildings and structures in Astana